Stefania Simova (born 5 June 1963) is a Bulgarian athlete. She competed in the women's discus throw at the 1992 Summer Olympics.

References

1963 births
Living people
Athletes (track and field) at the 1992 Summer Olympics
Bulgarian female discus throwers
Olympic athletes of Bulgaria
Place of birth missing (living people)